Glyphandra is a monotypic moth genus of the family Crambidae described by Ferdinand Karsch in 1900. It contains only one species, Glyphandra biincisalis, described by the same author in the same year. It is found in Cameroon, Equatorial Guinea and Togo.

References

Acentropinae
Monotypic moth genera
Moths of Africa
Crambidae genera
Taxa named by Ferdinand Karsch